Robert Cyril Claude Brooks (27 January 1930 – 23 September 1944) was the youngest Canadian soldier to die in the Second World War. A member of the Canadian Reserve Army, Brooks was killed in a training accident at the age of 14 on Prince Edward Island.

Origins and Death
Robert Brooks was the son of Eugene Ernest Brooks and Wanda Maude Brooks. He enlisted in the 17th (Reserve) Armoured Regiment (Prince Edward Island Light Horse) in early 1944, apparently without his parents' permission.  Brooks was killed in a training accident near Coleman, PEI, at approximately 7:30 p.m. on 23 September 1944, when a Universal Carrier was driven through a guardrail on a bridge, overturning in the water below. Brooks was trapped beneath the overturned vehicle and drowned, along with two fellow members of the 17th (Reserve) Armoured Regiment, Sergeant D. C. Ramsay and Trooper W.N. Dennis.

Aftermath
The Canadian Pension Commission determined that Boy Brooks' death was "related to military service"; however, his parents received no pension after his death, as the Pension Commission found that "It is not considered that the parents are in a dependent condition at the present time". Brooks' father was a serving member of the RCAF, and his mother was receiving a dependent's allowance and assigned pay from her husband.

Brooks is commemorated in the Canadian Virtual War Memorial  and was added to the Canadian Books of Remembrance in June 2018 with Sgt. Ramsay and Tpr. Dennis.

Bibliography 
Notes

References 

 - Total pages: 488 

Canadian Army personnel of World War II
1930 births
1944 deaths
People from Summerside, Prince Edward Island
Canadian Army soldiers
Child soldiers in World War II
Canadian military personnel killed in World War II

Prince Edward Island Regiment